Jayalakshmipuram is an urban commercial and residential suburb of Mysore city in Karnataka state, India. Residence of Noted Kannada Poet Javaregowda is located in Jayalakshmipuram.

Etymology 
Named after Jayalakshammani (1881–1924), Princess of Chamarajendra Wadiyar X who married her youngest maternal uncle in 1897, Mr. M. Kantaraj Urs, Diwan of Mysore (1919 - 1922). Her residence Jayalakshmi Vilas Palace built for her name in Manasa Gangotri is now a Post-Graduate Centre of the University of Mysore.

Location 
Located between Hunsur Road and Kalidasa Road, Jayalakshmipuram is famous for BM Habitat Mall, BM Hospital St Joseph's Primary School, SBRR Mahajana First Grade College.

References 

Suburbs of Mysore
Mysore North